Maguan County is located in Wenshan Zhuang and Miao Autonomous Prefecture, Yunnan province, China, bordering Vietnam's Lào Cai and Ha Giang provinces to the south.

Administrative divisions
In the present, Maguan County has 9 towns and 4 townships. 
9 towns

4 townships

Ethnic groups
The Maguan County Gazetteer (1996) lists the following ethnic subgroups.

Han
Zhuang
Buyi
Dai
Miao
Yao
Yi (Lolo) 
Pu 仆 (autonyms: Toulapa 托拉葩 and Alapa 阿拉葩), related to the Phù Lá in Vietnam 
Luo 倮 (autonyms: Luomo 罗摩 and Lemo 勒摩)
Mongol
Laji (拉基)

Transport
Nearest airport: Wenshan Airport

Climate

References

External links
Maguan County Official Website

County-level divisions of Wenshan Prefecture